Fourth Lake is a  lake located on Vancouver Island at the expansion of Sadie Creek south of the Nanaimo River. It is one of the Nanaimo Lakes.

References

Alberni Valley
Lakes of Vancouver Island
Dunsmuir Land District